Clay Doggett (born September 5, 1983) is an American businessman, law enforcement officer, and politician from the state of Tennessee. A Republican, Doggett has represented the 70th district of the Tennessee House of Representatives, based in Giles and Lawrence Counties, since 2019.

Career
Prior to running for office, Doggett worked in law enforcement as a correctional officer and a sheriff's deputy; he also is the founder and owner of a pressure washing company.

In 2017, Doggett announced he would run against Barry Doss, representative for the 70th district of the Tennessee House of Representatives, in the 2018 Republican primary. Running as a "grassroots conservative," Doggett narrowly ousted Doss 52-48% before winning the general election soundly over Democrat Jessica Yokley.

In 2020, Doggett ran unopposed in both the Republican primary and the general election, winning the general with 22,568 votes.

Doggett co-sponsored constitutional carry legislation during the 2021 session and was passed on April 12, 2021. He also sponsored the "Second Amendment Privacy and Protection Act of 2021", which prevents a state or local entity from creating a registry to track citizens who legally possess firearms in the state, and was passed on June 2, 2021. Both laws went into effect on July 1.

On December 30, 2021, Doggett announced he would run for his second re-election bid in 2022.

Current committees
As of December 2021, Doggett sits on the following committees:
 Criminal Justice Subcommittee (Chair)
 Agriculture and Natural Resources Committee
 Criminal Justice Committee
 Health and Safety Committee of the Second Extraordinary Session
 Elections Committee of the Third Extraordinary Session

Electoral record

Personal life
Doggett lives in Pulaski with his wife, Mary, and their 3 children.

References

Living people
Republican Party members of the Tennessee House of Representatives
21st-century American politicians
1983 births
University of Alabama in Huntsville alumni